Francesca Hong (born November 4, 1988) is an American chef, community organizer, and politician from the U.S. state of Wisconsin. A Democrat, she is the representative of the 76th district of the Wisconsin State Assembly, based in the Madison Isthmus.  Elected in November 2020, she is the first Asian American member of the Wisconsin Legislature.

Early life and career
Hong was born in 1988 in Madison to Korean American immigrant parents who moved to the country in the 1980s for her father's graduate degree.  In 2009, after attending the University of Wisconsin–Madison, Hong began working as a chef, eventually becoming executive chef at 43 North Restaurant. Alongside her husband, who is also a chef, Hong went on to open her own ramen restaurant, Morris Ramen, in 2016.  Hong is also a founder of the Culinary Ladies Collective.

Political career

Election 
In 2020, Hong announced her campaign for the 76th district of the Wisconsin State Assembly, after incumbent Chris Taylor was appointed a judge of the Wisconsin Circuit Court and had to resign her Assembly seat. Hong won a seven-way Democratic primary with 28 percent of the vote.  With the COVID-19 pandemic looming over the 2020 campaign, Hong emphasized her experiences as a chef and restaurant owner, noting that the disproportionate impact of the virus demonstrated the need for structural reform in the economy and the government.  She easily defeated Republican Patrick Hull in the November general election. She is the first Asian American state legislator in Wisconsin history.

Tenure 
Hong is a supporter of environmental rights. On August 1, 2021, she was among 10 people to sign up for a "dunk tank" fundraiser in Madison to raise awareness about the importance of clean water.  After the 2022 election, Hong was appointed to the Wisconsin Economic Development Corporation board of directors, to the seat controlled by the Assembly minority leader, Greta Neubauer.

Personal life
Hong lives in Madison, Wisconsin, with her husband, Matt, and their son.

Electoral history

Wisconsin Assembly (2020)

| colspan="6" style="text-align:center;background-color: #e9e9e9;"| Democratic Primary, August 11, 2020

| colspan="6" style="text-align:center;background-color: #e9e9e9;"| General Election, November 3, 2020

References

External links
 
 
 Representative Francesca Hong at Wisconsin Legislature
 Campaign website
 Morris Ramen
 The Culinary Ladies Collective
 76th Assembly District map (2011–2021)

 

Living people
Politicians from Madison, Wisconsin
Women state legislators in Wisconsin
Democratic Party members of the Wisconsin State Assembly
21st-century American politicians
American women of Korean descent in politics
Asian-American people in Wisconsin politics
21st-century American women politicians
1988 births